Buachaille Etive Mòr, 'great herdsman of Etive'), also known simply as 'The Buachaille', is a mountain at the head of Glen Etive in the Highlands of Scotland. Its pyramidal shape, as seen from the northeast, makes it one of the most recognisable mountains in Scotland, and one of the most depicted on postcards and calendars.

Buachaille Etive Mòr is a large ridge nearly five miles (8 km) long, almost entirely encircled by the River Etive and its tributary the River Coupall. The ridge contains four main peaks: from north-east to south-west these are Stob Dearg (1021.4 m), Stob na Doire (1011 m), Stob Coire Altruim (941 m) and Stob na Bròige (956 m). Stob Dearg and Stob na Bròige are both Munros; the latter was promoted to Munro status by the Scottish Mountaineering Club in 1997. To the west is the smaller ridge, Buachaille Etive Beag.

Climbing

The steep, craggy north-eastern face of Stob Dearg forms the classic aspect of the mountain as seen from the Kings House Hotel, and constitutes the most direct route of ascent for climbers and scramblers. Crowberry Ridge, a classic rock climb graded severe, was first climbed direct – and photographed – in 1900 by the Abraham brothers with Messrs Puttrell and Baker. Immediately to the left is Curved Ridge, one of the most famous scrambling routes.

Alternatively there is a somewhat eroded path leading steeply up the Coire na Tulaich which, in summer conditions, allows walkers to ascend the peaks, reaching the ridge about half a kilometre west of Stob Dearg.

Buachaille Etive Mòr is separated from its sister mountain of Buachaille Etive Beag to the west by the valley of Lairig Gartain. To the east lies Glen Etive, which provides an alternative route of ascent, heading up steep grassy slopes to the summit of Stob na Bròige. Another route follows the Allt Coire Altruim from the Lairig Gartain, reaching the ridge about two thirds of the way along from the north. This route is often used as descent route in conjunction with an ascent via Coire na Tulaich, forming a circular route with a walk out along the Lairig Gartain.

Injuries and deaths 

It was reported in 2009 that in the previous 30 years in the same area of Buachaille Etive Mor there had been three separate occasions when three people died.

In 1994 one person died in an avalanche on Buachaille Etive Mor.

In February 1995 three people died when they were descending down the mountain and an avalanche occurred. In 1995 there were six people who died on Buachaille Etive Mor.

In 2008 a person died in the same area of Buachaille Etive Mor where an avalanche occurred in 2009.

In January 2009 three people died and one was injured in an avalanche on Buachaille Etive Mòr. The avalanche occurred in the Coire na Tulaich area of the mountain.

In the past on Buachaille Etive Mor there have been 13 people who have died in the one 12-month period.

Lagangarbh Hut

The only building in the vicinity of Buachaille Etive Mòr is Lagangarbh Hut, popularly referred to as a cottage on account of its appearance. It sits at the foot of Buachaille Etive Mòr, adjacent to the River Coupall, and near the A82. It is owned by the National Trust, and managed by the Scottish Mountaineering Club, who make it available to hire as accommodation; up to 30 people can be accommodated.

In popular culture

Buachaille Etive Mòr appears in the background during a song sequence in the 1998 Bollywood film Kuch Kuch Hota Hai. Together with Beinn a'Chrulaiste it can also be seen in the film Skyfall, where James Bond transports M away from the villain Raoul Silva.
It was also the setting for the pop video "Whistle Down the Wind" by Nick Hayward.

Photography 
The Buachaille has become synonymous with Landscape Photography in Scotland and is probably the most photographed mountain in the country. The most popular spot for this is the small waterfalls on the River Coupall to the east of the mountain. In recent years, the condition of the ground around these falls has deteriorated rapidly and many photographers now actively encourage staying away from the area to allow for regeneration. The site has also become popular for wedding photography with the mountain providing a dramatic backdrop.

See also

 List of deaths on eight-thousanders
Mount Hood climbing accidents
Mountains and hills of Scotland
Scottish Highlands

References

External links
360Routes.com - Virtual Tour up Curved Ridge.
 Database of British and Irish Hills. Accessed 8 November 2006.
 Mountain Pictures, pictures of Buachaille etive mor Picture gallery of Buachaille Etive Mor

Accidents
Avalanches in the United Kingdom
1995 disasters in the United Kingdom
Climbing areas of Scotland
Death in the United Kingdom
Marilyns of Scotland
Mountains and hills of the Central Highlands
Mountains and hills of Highland (council area)
Mountaineering deaths
Mountaineering disasters
Munros
One-thousanders of Scotland